Comillas Pontifical University is a private Catholic higher education institution run by the Spanish Province of the Society of Jesus in Madrid, Spain.
The university is involved in a number of academic exchange programmes, work practice schemes and international projects with over 200 institutions of higher education in Europe, Latin America, North America and Asia.

History

Pope Leo XIII founded the Seminary of St. Anthony of Padua in 1890 in the town of Comillas, (Province of Santander, currently Cantabria), in response to efforts made by the Marquis of Comillas to build an institution for educating local candidates to the priesthood. At the time of its foundation, the seminary was entrusted to the Society of Jesus. In 1904, the seminary was raised to the status of a Pontifical university when Pope Pius X granted the school the power to confer academic degrees in theology, philosophy and canon law.

In 1969 the university was moved to Madrid, where it admitted a wider range of students including international students.

In 1978 the Jesuits incorporated into the university their Madrid's higher education institution ICAI-ICADE, the resultant entity of the merger in 1960 of ICAI and ICADE, two institutes established in 1908 and 1956 respectively. They are today the ICAI School of Engineering, the ICADE School of Law and the ICADE School of Business and Economics.

Several other schools, like the San Juan de Dios School of Nursing, were incorporated later on, to reach the university's present structure of seven colleges and schools:
Facultad de Teología (Divinity School)
Facultad de Derecho Canónico (Canon Law School)
Facultad de Ciencias Humanas y Sociales (Human & Social Sciences School)
Escuela Técnica Superior de Ingeniería ICAI (ICAI School of Engineering)
Facultad de Ciencias Económicas y Empresariales ICADE (ICADE School of Business & Economics) 
Facultad de Derecho ICADE (ICADE School of Law)
Escuela Universitaria de Enfermería y Fisioterapia "San Juan de Dios" (Saint John of God's School of Nursing and Physiotherapy)

Study and research centres and institutes have been created (Institute for Research in Technology, Institute for Liberalism, Krausism and Freemasonry Research, Graduate Studies Institute, Institute for Educational Science, Institute for Migration Research, Faith and Secularism Institute, Law Innovation Center, Modern Language Institute, University Institute on the Family).

See also 
 Antonio López y López
 List of Jesuit sites
 List of modern universities in Europe (1801–1945)

References

External links
Universidad Pontificia Comillas. Official website
IIT - Institute for Research in Technology. Official website

 
Educational institutions established in 1890
Catholic universities and colleges in Spain
Jesuit universities and colleges in Spain
Engineering universities and colleges in Spain
1890 establishments in Spain